The year 2012 is marked, in science fiction, by the following events.

Events

George Lucas sold Lucasfilm, with all its property, including Star Wars franchise, to Disney for $4 billion.
 Esli magazine closed down.

Deaths

 February 3 – John Christopher, British writer (born 1922)
 June 5 – Ray Bradbury, American writer (b. 1920)
 August 15 – Harry Harrison, American writer (b. 1925)
 November 19 – Boris Strugatsky, Russian writer (b. 1933)

Films
Antiviral
Battleship
Chronicle
Cloud Atlas
Evangelion: 3.0 You Can (Not) Redo
Dredd
The Hunger Games
Iron Sky
John Carter
John Dies at the End
Lockout
Looper
Men in Black 3
Prometheus
Resident Evil: Retribution
Robot & Frank
Total Recall
Universal Soldier: Day of Reckoning
Upside Down
The Watch

Literature
Earth Unaware by Orson Scott Card and Aaron Johnson
Shadows in Flight by Orson Scott Card
Caliban's War by James S.A. Corey

Awards

Saturn Award 

Best science fiction film: Rise of the Planet of the Apes
Best Network Television Series: Fringe

Locus Award
 Best Science Fiction Novel - Embassytown by China Miéville

References

Fiction set in 2012
 Science fiction by year